A siesta (from Spanish, pronounced  and meaning "nap") is a short nap taken in the early afternoon, often after the midday meal. Such a period of sleep is a common tradition in some countries, particularly those in warm-weather zones. The "siesta" can refer to the nap itself, or more generally to a period of the day, generally between 2 and 5 PM. This period is used for sleep, as well as leisure, mid-day meals, or other activities.

Siestas are historically common throughout the Mediterranean and Southern Europe, the Middle East, mainland China, and the Indian subcontinent. The siesta is an old tradition in Spain and, through Spanish influence, most of Latin America. The Spanish word siesta derives originally from the Latin word hora sexta  "sixth hour" (counting from dawn, hence "midday rest").

Factors explaining the geographical distribution of the modern siesta are warm temperatures and heavy intake of food at the midday meal. Combined, these two factors contribute to the feeling of post-lunch drowsiness. In many countries that practice the siesta, the summer heat can be unbearable in the early afternoon, making a midday break at home welcome.

Biological need for naps
The timing of sleep in humans depends upon a balance between homeostatic sleep propensity, the need for sleep as a function of the amount of time elapsed since the last adequate sleep episode, and circadian rhythms which determine the ideal timing of a correctly structured and restorative sleep episode. The homeostatic pressure to sleep starts growing upon awakening. The circadian signal for wakefulness starts building in the (late) afternoon. As professor of sleep medicine Charles Czeisler notes, "The circadian system is set up in a beautiful way to override the homeostatic drive for sleep."

Thus, in many people, there is a dip when the drive for sleep has been building for hours and the drive for wakefulness has not yet started. This is, again quoting Czeisler, "a great time for a nap". The drive for wakefulness intensifies through the evening, making it difficult to get to sleep 2–3 hours before one's usual bedtime when the wake maintenance zone ends.

In different countries

Taking a long lunch break including a nap is common in a number of Mediterranean, tropical, and subtropical countries. The Washington Post of 13 February 2007 reports at length on studies in Greece that indicate that those who nap have less risk of heart attacks.

In the United States, the United Kingdom, and a growing number of other countries, a short sleep has been referred to as a "power nap", a term coined by Cornell University social psychologist James Maas and recognized by other research scientists such as Sara Mednick as well as in the popular press. Siesta is also practiced in some still colder regions, such as Patagonia. The power nap is called riposo in Northern Italy and pennichella or pisolino in Southern Italy.

It used to be the custom in Russia, with Adam Olearius stating such was "the custom of the Countrey, where sleep is as necessary after Dinner as in the Night". One source of hostility toward False Dmitriy I was that he did not "...indulge in the siesta."

In Southern Italy the siesta is called controra (from contro ("counter") + ora "hour"), that is believed as a magical moment of the day, in which the world comes back in possession of ghosts and spirits. In Dalmatia (coastal Croatia), the traditional afternoon nap is known as pižolot (from Venetian pixolotto). In Egypt as with other Middle Eastern countries, government workers typically work 6 hours a day, 6 days a week. Due to this schedule, workers do not eat lunch at work, but instead leave work around 2 pm and eat their main meal, which is the heaviest, at lunchtime. Following the heavy lunch, they take a taaseela or nap and have tea upon waking up. For dinner, they usually have a smaller meal.

Einhard's Life of Charlemagne describes the emperor's summertime siestas: "In summer, after his midday meal, he would eat some fruit and take another drink; then he would remove his shoes and undress completely, just as he did at night, and rest for two or three hours."

India has culture of after lunch naps now diminishing with the inroads made by modern western work culture. Yoga advocates a small nap after lunch. It is called "Vam-Kukshi" (literally, lying down on one's left side). Lying on the left side has purported benefits for digestion and preventing food reflux.

Spain

In modern Spain, the midday nap during the working week has largely been abandoned among the adult working population. According to a 2009 survey, 16.2 percent of Spaniards polled claimed to take a nap "daily", whereas 22 percent did so "sometimes", 3.2 percent "weekends only" and the remainder, 58.6 percent, "never". The share of those who claimed to have a nap daily had diminished by 7 percent compared to a previous poll in 1998. Nearly three quarters of those who take siesta claimed to do so on the sofa rather than on the bed. The habit is more likely among the elderly or during summer holidays in order to avoid the high temperatures of the day and extend social life until the cooler late evenings and nights.

English-language media often conflates the siesta with the two to three hour lunch break that is characteristic of Spanish working hours, even though the working population is less likely to have time for a siesta and the two events are not necessarily connected. In fact, the average Spaniard works longer hours than almost all their European counterparts (typically 11-hour days, from 9am to 8pm).

As for the origins of the practice in Spain, the scorching summer heat predominant mostly in the South is thought to have motivated those doing agrarian work to take a break to avoid the hottest part of the day and be able to work longer hours when is cooler. In cities, the dismal economic situation in Spain in the post-Spanish Civil War years coincided with the advent of both a modern economy and urbanization. At that time, a long midday break—with or without siesta—was necessary for those commuting between the part-time jobs which were common in the sputtering economy.

Canada

Some Canadian hotels and motels advertise "siesta" rates for occupancy of a room for a few hours.

Cardiovascular benefits

The siesta habit has been associated with a 37 percent reduction in coronary mortality, possibly due to reduced cardiovascular stress mediated by daytime sleep.

Epidemiological studies on the relations between cardiovascular health and siesta have led to conflicting conclusions, possibly because of poor control of confounding variables, such as physical activity. It is possible that people who take a siesta have different physical activity habits, for example, waking earlier and scheduling more activity during the morning. Such differences in physical activity may lead to different 24-hour profiles in cardiovascular function. Even if such effects of physical activity can be discounted in explaining the relationship between siesta and cardiovascular health, it is still not known whether the daytime nap itself, a supine posture, or the expectancy of a nap is the most important factor.

References

Works cited

Further reading

External links

 Why we could all do with a Siesta – An article about research results from the University of Manchester. 
 Is there a decline in Siesta – An article about the decline in siesta.
 Medical disadvantages correlated with Siesta – An article from the Oxford Journal.

Sleep
Spanish culture